Volare is the Latin and Italian verb to fly; with an acute accent added to the final e ("volaré"), it also becomes Spanish for I will fly. It may refer to:

 "Volare" (song), a popular Italian song officially titled "Nel blu, dipinto di blu"
 Volare (film), a 2019 Italian film
 Volare Airlines (currently "C.A.I. Second"), an Italian passenger airline
 Volare Airlines, a Ukrainian cargo airline
 Volare roller coaster, a ride manufactured by Zamperla
 Plymouth Volaré, a model of automobile